The St. Joseph's Cathedral  also called Metropolitan Cathedral of St. Joseph is a Catholic church, home of the Archdiocese of Fortaleza, located in Fortaleza in Brazil. The present church was built on the site of the old church.

It took to complete the work forty years beginning in 1938 and was inaugurated in 1978. It can accommodate five thousand people and its towers reach 75 meters high. French architect George Maunier signed the draft eclectic style with a predominance of neo-Gothic, with references to the Cologne Cathedral in Germany and very similar to the Chartres Cathedral in France. São José is the Saint linked to the cathedral which is also known as the Metropolitan Cathedral of Fortaleza.

See also
Roman Catholicism in Brazil
St. Joseph's Cathedral (disambiguation)

References

Joseph
Buildings and structures in Fortaleza
Roman Catholic churches completed in 1978
Roman Catholic churches in Ceará
20th-century Roman Catholic church buildings in Brazil